The Town of Port Hedland is a local government area in the Pilbara region of Western Australia containing the twin settlements of Port Hedland and South Hedland and the industrial precinct of Wedgefield. It had a population of approximately 14,500 as at the 2016 Census of which only a few hundred live outside the settlement boundaries.

History

The Pilbara Road District was gazetted on 22 June 1894. It lost some territory to the new Nullagine Road District on 8 July 1898. It was renamed the Port Hedland Road District on 18 March 1904.

It became the Shire of Port Hedland on 1 July 1961 under the Local Government Act 1960, which reformed all remaining road districts into shires. It underwent substantial boundary changes on 28 April 1972, losing approximately 5,669 square kilometres to the Shire of Marble Bar and gaining approximately 18.3 square kilometres from the Shire of Roebourne. It assumed its current name when it gained town status on 18 March 1989.

In June 2019 the Council was suspended by the state government and replaced with a commissioner.

In October 2019, the government of Western Australia announced that there would be no further residential development of the West End of Port Hedland to protect sensitive population groups from health effects caused by dust generated by Port activities.

Wards
The town has eight councillors and no wards.

Towns and localities
The towns and localities of the Port Hedland with population and size figures based on the most recent Australian census:

(* indicates locality is only partially located within this shire)

Former towns
 Condon (a.k.a. Shellborough)

Heritage-listed places

As of 2023, 81 places are heritage-listed in the Town of Port Hedland, of which seven are on the State Register of Heritage Places.

References

External links
 

Port Hedland
Port Hedland, Western Australia